Senator Greiner may refer to:

Jon Greiner (born 1951), Utah State Senate
Sandy Greiner (born 1945), Iowa State Senate
William P. Greiner (fl. 1910s–1930s), New York State Senate